Soundless Wind Chime  is a 2009 independent film directed by Hung Wing Kit, starring Lu Yu Lai and Bernhard Bulling. It was a 2009 Nominee for the Berlin International Film Festival's Teddy Award.

Plot
Soundless Wind Chime centers around a new immigrant to Hong Kong from China, Ricky (Lu Yu Lai), who works as a delivery boy while living with his prostitute aunt (Wella Zhang). He is pickpocketed by a Swiss thief, Pascal (Bernhard Bulling) who is in an abusive relationship with his con artist boyfriend (Hannes Lindenblatt). Deciding to leave him, Pascal has a chance encounter with Ricky and the two begin a romantic relationship. The couple struggles through good times and bad, forcing them to determine if their relationship is based on love or dependence on one another. Several years later, Ricky searches Switzerland for signs of Pascal, eventually encountering Ueli (also played by Bulling), a timid antique store owner who looks the same as Pascal, but who has a vastly different personality. As Ricky and Ueli's relationship deepens, the truth of Pascal and Ricky's relationship is unraveled as the film progresses through glimpses of the present and the past.

Cast
 Lu Yu Lai - Ricky
 Bernhard Bulling - Pascal/Ueli
 Marie Omlin - Sister
 Gilles Tschudi - Father
 Ruth Schwegler - Mother
 Wella Zhang - Auntie
 Li Wai Foon - Restaurant Owner
 Wong Siu Yin - Popo
 Hannes Lindenblatt - Marcus
 Jackie Leung - Singing Angel

Accolades
In the Turin GLBT international Film Festival, Italy, the film has won the Audience Award, Nuovi sguardi (Best New Director), and a Special Jury Mention for Best Feature Film in Competition.

The film has also won the Best Direction, and Best Actor (Lu Yulai) awards in the - Madrid International Gay & Lesbian Film Festival 2009.

In Canada, Soundless Wind Chime has won the best international feature in the Vancouver Queer Film Festival, and the Jury Award For Best Feature Film in the Image+Nation Festival Cinema LGBT Montreal.

The film was featured in the 59th Annual Berlin International Film Festival and was an official nominee for the 2009 "Teddy Award."

Music
The film features an original score produced by Claudio Puntin and Insa Rudolph performed by Sepiasonic and also contains music by artist Justin McGrath as well as the song "Achoo Cha Cha" by classic Chinese singer and actress Grace Chang.

See also
 Speechless, a 2012 gay-themed film with a similar atmosphere, and which also features, as its main theme, an affair between two young men, one Chinese and the other, Western. Unlike Soundless Wind Chime, the film's dialogue is mostly in Mandarin (Putonghua), the national language of China.
 List of Chinese films of 2009
 List of lesbian, gay, bisexual or transgender-related films
 List of lesbian, gay, bisexual, or transgender-related films by storyline

References

External links
 

Sepiasonic

2009 drama films
2009 films
Gay-related films
2000s Cantonese-language films
Chinese independent films
English-language Hong Kong films
English-language Swiss films
2000s German-language films
Chinese LGBT-related films
English-language Chinese films
Hong Kong LGBT-related films
2000s Mandarin-language films
Films about race and ethnicity
Hong Kong independent films
Swiss LGBT-related films
2000s English-language films
2009 multilingual films
Chinese multilingual films
Hong Kong multilingual films
Swiss multilingual films
2000s Hong Kong films